Dakacha railway station is a railway station on Indore–Gwalior line under the Ratlam railway division of Western Railway zone. This is situated beside Trimurti Warehousing & Marketing Road at Dakachya in Indore district of the Indian state of Madhya Pradesh.

References

Railway stations in Indore district
Ratlam railway division